Macromia magnifica, the western river cruiser, is a species of cruiser in the dragonfly family Macromiidae. It is found in Central America and North America.

The IUCN conservation status of Macromia magnifica is "LC", least concern, with no immediate threat to the species' survival. The population is stable. The IUCN status was reviewed in 2018.

References

External links

Macromiidae
Articles created by Qbugbot
Insects described in 1874